Young Liberals of Norway (NUV) is the youth league of the Norwegian political party Venstre. Young Liberals was founded on 27 January 1909, with Anders Kirkhusmo as the first leader. The current president is Sondre Hansmark, since 2017. Vice presidents are Ane Breivik and Lars Brandsås, and the International Officer is Idun Gulla Dyrnes. It advocates a more liberal version of the mother party's social liberalist ideology.

Young Liberals of Norway is a member of the international liberal youth organizations:
 European Liberal Youth (LYMEC)
 International Federation of Liberal Youth (IFLRY)

Name
The Norwegian name 'Unge Venstre' has historical reasons, and although it literally translates as 'Young Left' in English, Young Liberals of Norway are not socialists, but in fact liberals. To avoid confusion, the official English-language name of the party is 'Young Liberals of Norway'. Proposals to change the name of Unge Venstre to 'Liberal Ungdom' ('Liberal Youth') have been defeated in successive congresses.

Policies of Young Liberals of Norway
 The Young Liberals are strongly in favour of fighting climate change, calling it "the greatest threat of our time" on their website. As a result, the Young Liberals are in favour of helping renewable energy become competitive through subsidies, but believe that the market rather than politicians should determine which technology is best. The Young Liberals oppose the construction gas power stations without Carbon capture and storage, and opposes subsidies for polluting industries. The Young Liberals are also in favour of other types of environmental protection, such as hindering oil exploration of the coast of Lofoten due to the fragility of the environment.
 The Young Liberals are in favour of free trade, especially the removal of tariffs on the products of developing nations. This is seen as an integral part of achieving global economic justice rather than a threat to it.
 The Young Liberals are arguably the most pro-immigration political group in Norway, and advocate free labour immigration. The Young Liberals supports compulsory classes in Norwegian as a prerequisite for gaining citizenship.
 The Young Liberals are in favour of Norwegian membership in the European Union, and criticise the European Economic Area agreement as undemocratic because Norway is not represented when decisions regarding it are taken.
 The Young Liberals have recently become especially prominent in the debate on drug policy, and is advocating harm reduction policies. It is calling for legalization and regulation of all drugs. The youth party also advocates administration of clean heroin to drug addicts who have not succeeded in other means of rehabilitation. Furthermore, the party stresses that more resources must be spent on rehabilitation, health care and follow-ups for both previous and existing drug addicts.

Relationship with Venstre
Young Liberals of Norway are independent of Venstre but co-operates closely with them, for example the leader of Young Liberals is automatically a member of the central governing body (Sentralstyret) of Venstre. Venstre and Young Liberals have different opinions on some matters, most prominently in that Young Liberals of Norway supports Norwegian entry into the European Union while Venstre opposes this. The Young Liberals of Norway failed to make Venstre pro-EU during Venstre's party congress in April 2009.

The Young Liberals are generally more liberal in their views than the mother party, both on social and economic issues. They aim to influence Venstre views so that they accords more with those of the Young Liberals. Notable recent victories include convincing Venstre to support heroin prescription in the treatment of addiction, to consider drug decriminalization and to support intellectual property reform.

Organisation 
Young Liberals of Norway is organized into 19 regional branches, with local clubs in about 50 municipalities. The highest decision-making body of the organisation is the yearly national congress. Between the national congresses, the organisation is governed by a national board and an executive board.

The executive board members of the Norwegian Young Liberals are:

 Sondre Hansmark (President)
 Ane Breivik (1. Vice President)
 Lars Øye Brandsås (2. Vice President)
 Idun Gulla Dyrnes (International officer)
 Amelia Aune
 Ole Kristian Sandvik
 Benedicte Bjørnås
 Timo Nikolaisen
 August Simonsen

Deputies:
 Johan Malvik
 Simon Seland

Secretary General: Linn Skyum

Leaders of Young Liberals of Norway

References

External links
 Website of Unge Venstre 
 The Young Liberals of Norway 

Youth wings of political parties in Norway
Youth wings of liberal parties
1909 establishments in Norway